Seven is the seventh album of singer/actor/host Janno Gibbs. It was produced and released by GMA Records in September 2004.

Track listing

Note: Seven also has a Special Edition album. This includes the following tracks:

See also
 GMA Records
 Janno Gibbs
 Little Boy

References

2004 albums
Soul albums
Janno Gibbs albums
GMA Music albums